Marina Kitroser de Waisman (26 November 1920 – 1997) was an Argentine architect, critic, and writer. She was awarded the Premio América in 1987.

Biography
Waisman was born in Buenos Aires. She graduated as an architect from the National University of Córdoba in 1944. She was a professor at the same university from 1948, when the first Chair of Contemporary Architecture was created, until 1971. Between 1956 and 1959, she taught at National University of Tucumán with Enrico Tedeschi and Francisco Bullrich, creating Instituto Interuniversitario de Historia de Arquitectura (IIDEHA; Interuniversity Institute of History of Architecture).<ref>{{cite book|last1=Liernur|first1=Jorge Francisco|last2=Aliata|first2=Fernando|title=Diccionario de Arquitectura en la Argentina., Jorge F. Liernur y Fernando Aliata|date=2004|publisher=Clarín|location=Buenos Aires|isbn=950-782-423-5}}</ref>

In 1974, she joined the Faculty of Architecture of the Catholic University of Cordoba where she formed the Instituto de Historia y Preservación del Patrimonio (Institute of History and Heritage Preservation; now called the Marina Waisman Institute). She founded and developed Seminarios de Arquitectura Latinoamericana (SAL; Latin American Architecture Seminar) in 1985 in Buenos Aires. In 1987, she was awarded the America Prize for her work and critical contributions to Latin American architecture. In 1980, in collaboration with Freddy Guidi and Teresa Sassi, she worked on the recovery and restoration of the Municipal Museum José Malanca (today Centro Cultural España Córdoba). In 1991, she was appointed professor emeritus of the National University of Córdoba. The following year, she returned to the National University of Córdoba, creating there the Center for Research Training in History, Theory and Criticism of Architecture, now called the Marina Waisman Center.

She was a member of the Academia Nacional de Bellas Artes de Argentina. Waisman died in 1997 in Río Cuarto, Córdoba.

Selected works
 1964, 10 recorridos por Córdoba a traves de su arquitectura (with Juan Carlos Montenegro; Rodolfo Imas)
 1967, Iideha : publicación semestral de crítica y bibliografia de historia de la arquitectura : Instituto Interuniversitario de Historia de la Arquitectura, Córdoba, Argentina, diciembre, 1957 1974, Algunos conceptos críticos para el estudio de la arquitectura latinoamericana 1976, Canadá : arquitectura educacional y hospitalaria 1977, La estructura histórica del entorno 1978, Documentos para una historia de la arquitectura argentina (Ramón Gutiérrez)
 1980, Baudizzione, Erbin, Lestard, Varas 1986, La parábola de la modernidad : arquitectura joven en Alemania 1987,  Arquitectura colonial argentina (with Ricardo Jesse Alexander)
 1989, 10 arquitectos latinoamericanos (with César Naselli)
 1990, El interior de la historia : historiografía arquitectónica para uso de Latinoamericanos 1991, Arquitectura en la era Posmoderna 1995, La arquitectura descentrada 1996, Córdoba Argentina, guía de arquitectura : 15'' (with Juana Bustamante; Gustavo Ceballos)

References

Bibliography

External links 
 Centro Marina Waisman, Universidad Nacional de Córdoba
 Instituto Marina Waisman, Universidad Católica de Córdoba
 Marina Waisman, Un día | una arquitecta, 27 May 2015

1920 births
1997 deaths
20th-century Argentine architects
20th-century Argentine writers
20th-century women writers
Argentine women architects
Argentine non-fiction writers
Argentine women writers
Argentine critics
Argentine women critics
National University of Córdoba alumni
Academic staff of the National University of Córdoba
Academic staff of the National University of Tucumán
Writers from Buenos Aires
20th-century non-fiction writers